Orophia quadripunctella is a species of moth in the family Depressariidae. It was described by Viette in 1955, and is known from Madagascar.

References

Moths described in 1955
Orophia